Pity Party may refer to:

Music
The Pity Party, American band from Los Angeles
Pity Party, a 2007 album by Más Rápido!
The Pity Party, a 1998 album by David Dondero
"Pity Party" (song), a 2015 single and 2016 EP by Melanie Martinez
"Pity Party", a 1978 song by Barbara Mandrell from Moods
"Pity Party", a 1985 song by Bill Anderson
"Pity Party", a 2009 song by Blockhead from The Music Scene
"The Pity Party", a 2003 song by Breather Resist from Only in the Morning
"Pity Party", a 2008 song by The Dopamines
"Pity Party", a 2018 song by lovelytheband from Finding It Hard to Smile
"Pity Party", an unreleased song by Natasha Bedingfield
"Pity Party", a 2009 song by Saint Motel from ForPlay
"Pity Party", a 2013 song by Tricia from Radiate
"Pity Party", a 2011 song by Whitton from Rare Bird
"Pity Party (of One)", a 2013 song by Placebo from Loud Like Love

Television
"Pity Party", a 2008 episode of The Colbert Report

See also

Pity
Self-pity
Puddles Pity Party, American clown band from Atlanta